Trond Lykke (3 February 1946 – 17 November 2020) was a Norwegian merchant.

Career
Lykke was born in Trondheim, a grandson of merchant and prime minister Ivar Lykke. He was manager of the family  merchandise I. K. Lykke from 1978 to 2005 (when his son  took over), and chairman of the board from 1985. In 1981 he established the retail chain, Bunnpris.

Lykke was adopted into the Royal Norwegian Society of Sciences and Letters in 1998. From 2005 he was Danish consul in Trondheim.

He died on 17 November 2020.

References

1946 births
2020 deaths
People from Trondheim
Norwegian merchants
Norwegian businesspeople in retailing